The Miguel Valdez Barn, on San Joaquin Church Loop Rd. in Encenada, New Mexico, was likely built in the 1920s.  It was listed on the National Register of Historic Places in 1986.

In 1985 it consisted of "three rectangular modules of horizontal logs with double saddle notches; spanned by log beams; covered by planks covered with hay. Double post and rail corral extends c. 20 feet in front (NE) of barn. Located in a field east of Ensenada near the southeast corner of the village's irrigated fields."  It was deemed significant as "one of the best local examples of Hispanic modular barn construction. It is one of the few shed-roofed barns in the area; most have received gabled metal roofs against the heavy winter snows."

References

Barns on the National Register of Historic Places in New Mexico
National Register of Historic Places in Rio Arriba County, New Mexico
Buildings and structures completed in 1925